Stanley Paris Rutherford "Stan" Kane (11 May 1929 – 2 September 2015) was a Scottish actor, singer and painter who was best known for his role as the menacing villain Jim in David Winning's first feature film Storm.

Kane spent several years performing on the Canadian musical series The Pig and Whistle. He married Canadian singer and teacher and longtime companion Judith Lebane Kane on 5 November 1989.  On 2 September 2015, he died in Toronto at the age of 86.

Filmography

References

External links

1929 births
2015 deaths
21st-century Scottish male actors